Zuta is an unincorporated community located in Glynn County, Georgia, United States.

References

Unincorporated communities in Glynn County, Georgia
Unincorporated communities in Georgia (U.S. state)